Bodaybinsky (masculine), Bodaybinskaya (feminine), or Bodaybinskoye (neuter) may refer to:
Bodaybinsky District, a district of Irkutsk Oblast, Russia
Bodaybinskoye Urban Settlement, a municipal formation which the town of Bodaybo and the selo of Nerpo in Bodaybinsky District of Irkutsk Oblast, Russia are incorporated as